The Houston Bar Center Building is a building in downtown Houston, in the U.S. state of Texas.

See also
 National Register of Historic Places listings in downtown Houston, Texas

References

Buildings and structures in Houston